was a Japanese actor. He was one of the leading tachiyaku Kabuki actors of Japan's Meiji period (1868–1912) through the late 1940s.

Names
Like most Kabuki actors, Kōshirō took various stage names (gō) over the course of his career. A member of the Kōraiya guild, he was often called by that name, particularly in the practice of yagō, in which an actor's guild name is shouted out as a cheer or encouragement during a performance. Following in his birth father's footsteps as a master of traditional dance, he bore the stage name Fujima Kan'emon III in that context. In his first appearance on the Kabuki stage, he took the name Ichikawa Kintarō, and would later take the names Ichikawa Somegorō IV and Ichikawa Komazō VIII before coming to be known as the seventh Matsumoto Kōshirō.

Early life
The son of buyō (traditional dance) master Fujima Kan'emon II, he was adopted into the kabuki theatre by Ichikawa Danjūrō IX, who then became his master. Kōshirō's sons would come to take the stage names Ichikawa Danjūrō XI, Matsumoto Kōshirō VIII, and Onoe Shōroku II; his son-in-law, Nakamura Jakuemon IV, was also an actor, along with many of Kōshirō's grandsons and great-grandsons.

He was the third son of a builder and contractor. He was noticed by Fujima Kan'emmon II, an important buyō dance master, who adopted him and instructed him in the art of traditional dances. He was later noted by Ichikawa Danjuro IX, who thought he would have been better suited to Kabuki and took him under his protection.

Career 
Under the name Ichikawa Kintarō, he debuted in 1881, at age eleven. He grew up to become Danjuro's best disciple. The young Kintaro was indiscreet and featured in many escapades, angering his master. He was expelled from the Ichikawa clan. For a long time it was thought he would never return to the stage. He was later forgiven and by April 1890 returned to the stage and took the name Ichikawa Somegorō IV. In 1893 he took part in the opening ceremonies of Tokyo's Meiji-za theatre.

During these years he first performed the prestigious role of the warrior priest Benkei in Kanjincho, a role which was back then exclusive to Danjuro's clan and which required their permission to perform the role (Ichikawa Ennosuke III's great-grandfather, Danshiro II, was expelled from the Ichikawa clan for the same reason).

Months before his master's death in 1903, he gtook the name Ichikawa Komazō VIII. This particular name had been used by several actors of both Ichikawa Danjuro and Matsumoto Koshiro's clans and receiving it was an honour.

He took part in the 1911 opening ceremonies of the Imperial Theater, and took the name Matsumoto Kōshirō, one of the most prestigious roles in the Kabuki world which had not been used for over half a century, at a shūmei naming ceremony there a few months later. Along with the onnagata Onoe Baikō VI and wagotoshi Sawamura Sōjūrō VII, Kōshirō became one of the troupe's leading actors.

He performed, often alongside these two compatriots, in productions in Tokyo, Kyoto and Osaka, a rare feat for a Kabuki actor. This was in large part due to the differences between the Tokyo (Edo) and Kyoto-Osaka (Kamigata) styles of acting; few actors were particularly successful at performing in both regions. Two of his more common roles in this period, which he played in multiple cities, were those of Nikko Danjō in Meiboku Sendai Hagi and Benkei. Though a specialist in male roles, and in particular the aragoto warrior roles like Benkei, Kōshirō on occasion played women, such as Lady Yoshio in Meiboku Sendai Hagi.

Continuing the trade of his adoptive father, Kōshirō became the head of the Fujima dance school in 1917, and took his father's name, becoming Fujima Kan'emon III; he would use this name when performing buyō traditional dance, but continued to be known as Kōshirō in the theatre world.

Kōshirō continued to perform in all three major cities through World War II, and made his last stage appearance in December 1948, at the Shinbashi Enbujō in Tokyo.

Family and legacy
Koshiro had three sons and a daughter. His sons would then become respectively Ichikawa Danjuro XI, Matsumoto Hakuo I (known once as Koshiro VIII) and Onoe Shoroku II. He passed Danjuro IX's knowledge and teaching techniques to them. They became without any doubts the best tachiyaku (male role specialists) of the first and early second half of the 20th century. His daughter married the onnagata actor Nakamura Jakuemon IV. He was also the father-in-law of Nakamura Kichiemon I's daughter. His grandsons became the most famous actors of the second half of the 20th century and still perform alongside his great-grandsons. Today he has blood relatives in many other Kabuki clans, such as Onoe Kikugoro, Danjuro and indirectly with Nakamura Kanzaburo's clans. No other actor left such a wide inheritance in the kabuki world.

He made the role of Benkei his trademark, performing it over 1600 times, in particular with fellow actors Ichimura Uzaemon XV in the role of Togashi and Onore Kikugoro VI or Baiko VI in the role of Yoshitsune. Recordings of these performances are some of the oldest recorded Japanese movies. Today the role of Benkei is considered the trademark of Koshiro's family.

Although he was a candidate to succeed to the name of his master, who didn't have a male heir, and become Danjuro X, his youthful indiscretions foreclosed this possibility. After Danjuro IX's death his son-in-law Sansho Ichikawa V, the new head of the family, was considering the idea, but Danjuro's widow never forgot Koshiro and stopped him. Sansho (posthumously Danjuro X) decided to adopt Koshiro's eldest son instead, who became Danjuro XI and new head of the family.

See also
 Matsumoto Kōshirō - line of kabuki actors

Notes

References
Matsumoto Kōshirō VII at Kabuki21.com

Kabuki actors
1870 births
1949 deaths